The Luhrs Building is a historic ten-story building located at 11 West Jefferson in  Downtown Phoenix, Arizona. It was listed on the Phoenix Historic Property Register in 1990. It was built by local businessman George H. N. Luhrs, an original Phoenix City Council member from 1881–85, at a cost of $553,000 USD, and opened on May 17, 1924. At the time, it was the tallest building in Phoenix and was said to be the largest building between El Paso and Los Angeles.

In 2009, the building was renovated with the help of a $500,000 historic preservation grant.

Architecture
The L-shaped Luhrs Building was designed in the Beaux-Arts style by the El Paso architectural firm of Trost & Trost. The building is faced with brown brick, with elaborate marble ornamentation on the uppermost two floors, and a heavy cornice at the top. Jay J. Garfield, a well known local builder was the contractor for the building.

The building's ground floor was leased by the US Treasury Dept. from 1924–1935. The 7th–10th floors were the original location of the Arizona Club, including dining rooms, lounges, a library, and bedrooms for club members. When the Arizona Club moved out of the Luhrs Building in 1971, the upper floors were also converted to office floor space. The 6th floor was originally occupied by Standard Oil.

See also
 Luhrs Tower – built in 1929, adjacent to the Luhrs Building.
 List of historic properties in Phoenix
 Phoenix Historic Property Register

References

Skyscraper office buildings in Phoenix, Arizona
Buildings and structures completed in 1924
Trost & Trost buildings
Beaux-Arts architecture in Arizona